Howmeh Rural District is in the Central District of Abhar County, Zanjan province, Iran. At the National Census of 2006, its population was 12,543 in 3,259 households. There were 6,448 inhabitants in 1,890 households at the following census of 2011. At the most recent census of 2016, the population of the rural district was 6,045 in 1,982 households. The largest of its 33 villages was Qerveh, with 2,686 people.

References 

Abhar County

Rural Districts of Zanjan Province

Populated places in Zanjan Province

Populated places in Abhar County